Jumellea arachnantha , 1915 is a species of orchid endemic to the Central Highlands of Madagascar and Grande Comore.

References

External links

arachnantha
Orchids of Madagascar
Flora of Grande Comore